Uladzislau Sergeyevich Davyskiba (born 31 March 2001) is a Belarusian professional volleyball player. He is a member of the Belarus national team. At the professional club level, he plays for Vero Volley Monza.

Personal life
Davyskiba was born in Zhlobin in eastern Belarus. His wife, Hanna also plays volleyball professionally.

Career

Clubs
Davyskiba started his professional volleyball career in his native country, playing for Stroitel Minsk. For the 2020–21 season, he joined Vero Volley Monza in Italy.

In 2022, his team made it to the finals of the 2021–22 CEV Cup, and emerged victorious from the matches against Tours VB. Davyskiba earned the Most Valuable Player award for the second leg match held in Tours.

Honours
 CEV Cup
  2021/2022 – with Vero Volley Monza
 National championships
 2017/2018  Belarusian SuperCup, with Stroitel Minsk
 2017/2018  Belarusian Cup, with Stroitel Minsk

Individual awards
 2022: CEV Cup – Most Valuable Player

References

External links
 
 Player profile at LegaVolley.it  
 Player profile at Volleybox.net

2001 births
Living people
People from Zhlobin District
Sportspeople from Gomel Region
Belarusian men's volleyball players
Belarusian expatriate sportspeople in Italy
Expatriate volleyball players in Italy
Outside hitters